Luke Graham may refer to:

 Luke Graham (footballer) (born 1986), footballer
 Luke Graham (politician) (born 1985), British Conservative politician, Former MP for Ochil and South Perthshire
 Luke Graham (wrestler) (1940–2006), American wrestler

See also
 Lukas Graham, Danish pop band